Barrow upon Trent is a civil parish in the South Derbyshire district of Derbyshire, England.  The parish contains twelve listed buildings that are recorded in the National Heritage List for England.  Of these, one is listed at Grade I, the highest of the three grades, and the others are at Grade II, the lowest grade.  The parish contains the villages of Barrow upon Trent and Arleston and the surrounding countryside, and is mainly rural.  The listed buildings include houses, two churches, a farmhouse, a bridge over the Trent and Mersey Canal, a former school, and a war memorial.


Key

Buildings

References

Citations

Sources

 

Lists of listed buildings in Derbyshire